The descendants of Miguel I of Portugal, of the House of Braganza, were numerous and left a lasting mark on European royalty. Miguel married Princess Adelaide of Löwenstein-Wertheim-Rosenberg and the strategic marriages for all of their children into various European royalties would earn Miguel the nickname of Grandfather of Europe.
 
His descendants can be found in both reigning and non-reigning royal families all over Europe.

This article deals with the children of Miguel I and in turn their senior heirs.

Background on Miguel I 

Miguel, born on 26 October 1802 at Queluz Royal Palace, was the second son of King João VI and Carlota Joaquina of Spain.

Throne of Portugal 

In 1823, Miguel led a coup in an attempt to place himself on the throne and restore the absolutist regime to Portugal. The coup, known as the Vilafrancada, took place on May 27, 1823 in Vila Franca de Xira.

The coup was unsuccessful and Miguel was forgiven and made chief of the army. This would not play out well, as Miguel would use his forces in the April Revolt. Following the eventual demise of the April Revolt, Miguel was exiled from Portugal.

Miguel returned to Portugal, as regent to his niece Queen Maria II of Portugal and also a potential royal consort. While regent, he seized the Portuguese throne in accordance with the so-called Fundamental Laws of the Kingdom and reigned for six years. His older brother Pedro IV of Portugal, Maria II's father, lost his, and therefore her, rights from the moment that Pedro had made war on Portugal and become the sovereign of a foreign state (the Brazilian Empire). This led to a difficult political situation which culminated in the Portuguese Liberal Wars between the absolutist Miguelists and constituitionalist liberals.

Pedro, Duke of Braganza (former Pedro IV of Portugal and I of Brazil) launched a campaign from the Azores which would eventually topple Miguel. The Miguelite War, one of the many names given to the civil war, would last throughout the six-year duration of Miguel's reign and would end with the Concession of Evoramonte, when Miguel renounced his claims to the throne, recognized Maria II as queen, and was exiled from Portugal.

Miguel would spend his exiled years in the Grand Duchy of Baden, where he would have seven children, with his wife Princess Adelaide of Löwenstein-Wertheim-Rosenberg. He and his wife would spend a great deal of their resources seeking to establish their family, through advantageous marriages of their children. Their descendants include the reigning sovereigns of Belgium, Liechtenstein, and Luxembourg.

Descendants 

On 24 September 1851, Miguel I married Princess Adelaide of Löwenstein-Wertheim-Rosenberg. The couple had 7 children:

Maria das Neves of Braganza

Miguel Januario of Braganza

Maria Teresa of Braganza

Maria José of Braganza

Adelgundes de Jesus of Braganza

Maria Ana of Braganza

Maria Antónia of Braganza

See also

 Descendants of Manuel I of Portugal
 Descendants of John VI of Portugal

References

Notes

Sources
 
 

Portuguese nobility
Portuguese royalty
House of Braganza
Miguel I of Portugal